Ballylinan GAA is a Gaelic Athletic Association Gaelic football club in Ballylinan, County Laois, Ireland. The club was founded in 1926 and has colours of green and gold.

Ballylinan Gaelic Athletic Association Club has been a central part of village life since it was founded in 1926. The club is a senior club which provides Gaelic football to all age groups from under six to adult. The club also formerly competed in the Laois Junior Hurling Championship.

Ballylinan has won the Laois Intermediate Football Championship title five times and in 1987 and 2017 reached the Laois Senior Football Championship final, losing to Portlaoise both times.

The club also works very closely with its ladies' football club, St Brigid's, who provide ladies' football for girls from under-12 to adult.

The Club Grounds are located at Aughanure, Ballylinan

Mick Lillis succeeded Niall Carew as manager ahead of the 2020 season.

Achievements
 Laois Intermediate Football Championships: (5)
 Laois All-County Football League Division 1: (1) 2000
 Laois All-County Football League Division 1B: (2) 2017, 2019
 Laois All-County Football League Division 2: (2) 1995, 1999
 Laois All-County Football League Division 4: (1) 1996

References

External links
 Ballylinan GAA Official Website
 Laoistalk - Laois GAA News Website

Gaelic games clubs in County Laois
Gaelic football clubs in County Laois
Hurling clubs in County Laois